Margarethe Bence (August 13, 1930 – April 1, 1992) was an American opera singer, who sang both mezzo-soprano and contralto parts and was mostly active in German and Austria, including international festivals such as the Bayreuth Festival and the Salzburg Festival. Her repertoire included music from Baroque to contemporary premieres.

Career
Born in Kingston, New York in a German-American family on August 13, 1930, Bence began her voice studies in the United States. She toured with the Robert Shaw Chorale from 1950 to 1953, when she continued her studies in Stuttgart. Her teachers included Res Fischer and Ellinor Junker-Giesen.

She appeared first in concert, especially in alto-parts of oratorios. In 1956 she joined the ensemble of the Württembergische Staatsoper, where she remained for 14 years. She studied a broad repertory, from Baroque to contemporary music, playing as both comic and tragic characters. She appeared as a guest artist, first in 1959 when the Stuttgart Opera performed Wagner's Parsifal at the Vienna State Opera. She was engaged there for Handel's Jephtha, with Fritz Wunderlich, and for Janáček's Jenůfa. In 1961, she appeared at the Opéra de Monte-Carlo as Annina in Der Rosenkavalier by Richard Strauss, which became one of her signature roles.

From 1962 she was invited to international festivals. She performed at the Bayreuth Festival, in 1962 as  Rossweisse and Waltraute in  Der Ring des Nibelungen, the next year also Erda in Das Rheingold and Siegfried, and a small part in Parsifal. In 1965 she performed Rossweisse once more.

She sang at the Bavarian State Opera first in 1963, the role of Babekan in the premiere of Werner Egk's Die Verlobung in San Domingo. In 1966, she appeared at the Schwetzingen Festival in the premiere of Hermann Reutter's Der Tod des Empedokles, and she made her debut at the Salzburg Festival as Marcellina in Mozart's Le nozze di Figaro. The new production was staged by Günther Rennert and conducted by Karl Böhm, with Claire Watson and Ingvar Wixell as the noble couple, Reri Grist and Walter Berry as Susanna and Figaro, and Edith Mathis as Cherubino. The production stayed in the repertory until 1971, always with Bence as Marcellina.

Bence moved to the Bavarian State Opera in 1970, where she sang among others Annina in the production conducted by Carlos Kleiber which was recorded. She appeared as a guest internationally, including Berlin, Bucharest, Paris, Rome, Rio de Janeiro and San Francisco. From 1976 on, she was a member of the Vienna State Opera for eleven years, where she performed 266 times in 27 parts. She also appeared at the Wiener Volksoper. From the 1970s, she was a voice teacher in Vienna and at the Musikhochschule Stuttgart. Her students included Malin Hartelius and Anna Korondi.

Margarethe Bence died in Munich on April 1, 1992, aged 61.

Selected parts

Premieres 
 1963: Die Verlobung in San Domingo by Werner Egk (after Heinrich von Kleist) – Bavarian State Opera
 1966: Der Tod des Empedokles by Hermann Reutter (after Friedrich Hölderlin) – Schwetzingen Festival
 1981: Baal by Friedrich Cerha (after Bertolt Brecht) – Salzburg Festival (Hausfrau, Ältere Dame)

Repertoire

Selected recordings

Opera 
 Berg: Lulu, Wiener Sofiensäle 1976, cond.: Christoph von Dohnányi – Garderobiere
 Mozart: Le nozze di Figaro, Salzburg Festival 1966, cond.: Karl Böhm – Marcellina
 Smetana: Prodaná nevesta, film 1976, cond.: Jaroslaw Krombholc – Ludmilla
 Strauss: Der Rosenkavalier, Bavarian State Opera 1973, cond.: Carlos Kleiber – Annina
 Wagner: Parsifal, Bayreuth Festival 1963, cond.: Hans Knappertsbusch – Second Knappe

Concert 
 Bach: Mass in B minor, 35. Deutsches Bachfest 1958, cond.: Hans Grischkat
 Bach: Ein feste Burg ist unser Gott, BWV 80, Württembergisches Kammerorchester 1967, cond.: Helmuth Rilling
 Bach: Schleicht, spielende Wellen, BWV 206, Bach-Collegium Stuttgart [1968], cond.: Helmuth Rilling
 Bach: Der zufriedengestellte Aeolus, BWV 205, Bach-Collegium Stuttgart [1972], cond.: Rilling
 Handel: Messiah, with Fritz Wunderlich and Otto von Rohr, 1959, cond.: Heinz Mende
 Mozart: Requiem, Stuttgarter Philharmoniker [1964], cond.: Roland Bader
 Mendelssohn: Elias, Stuttgarter Philharmoniker 1963, cond.: Bader
 Pergolesi: Stabat mater, Stuttgart 1957, cond.: Frieder Bernius
 Reger: An die Hoffnung für Alt und Orchester, Op. 124, cond.: Hermann Scherchen
 Vivaldi: Gloria in D major, Stuttgart [1957], cond.: Marcel Couraud

References

External links 
 

American operatic mezzo-sopranos
American operatic contraltos
1930 births
1992 deaths
Musicians from Kingston, New York
Singers from New York (state)
Academic staff of the State University of Music and Performing Arts Stuttgart
20th-century American women opera singers
Classical musicians from New York (state)
American women academics